Fabiana may refer to:

 Fabiana (plant), a genus of evergreen shrubs
 Fabiana imbricata
 Fabiana (name), a Brazilian and Italian given name (includes a list of people with the name)